Concobar mac Tadg Ua Cellaig, 37th King of Uí Maine, and 2nd Chief of the Name, died 1030.

There was formerly some confusion as to the succession of the kingdom following the death of Tadhg Mór at Clontarf in 1014. A poem, apparently wrote to praise Eoghan Ó Madadhan (died 1347) and his ancestors, though they never held the rule of that kingdom.

The annals state that Concobar mac Tadg Ua Cellaig was King of Uí Maine and was killed in battle by the men of Tethbae in 1030. His brother Diarmaid was killed in 1065. Both men were sons of the previous chief.

References

 The Tribes and customs of Hy-Many, commonly called O'Kelly's country, John O'Donovan, 1843.
 Annals of Ulster at CELT: Corpus of Electronic Texts at University College Cork
 Annals of Tigernach at CELT: Corpus of Electronic Texts at University College Cork
Revised edition of McCarthy's synchronisms at Trinity College Dublin.

 Byrne, Francis John (2001), Irish Kings and High-Kings, Dublin: Four Courts Press, 

People from County Galway
People from County Roscommon
Conchobar Maenmaige
11th-century Irish monarchs
Kings of Uí Maine